North Hills is a village in the Town of North Hempstead in Nassau County, on the North Shore of Long Island, in New York, United States. The population was 5,464 at the 2020 census.

History
The glacial action that formed much of Long Island deposited Shelter Rock in what is now North Hills approximately 11,000 years ago. The Matinecock had a village in the area. Farming developed in North Hills in the middle part of the 17th century. Around this time a long fence was built along the road later known as Northern Boulevard, to the north of North Hills. The lands of the Cow Neck Peninsula enclosed by the fence (present day Manhasset and Port Washington) were used for grazing.

During the 19th Century, one of the largest farms in the area was owned by Isaac Underhill Willets.

The village was incorporated in 1929 as a tax haven to prevent Manhasset from raising taxes on the property, as well as to gain and maintain home rule powers. The name North Hills was chosen due to how the village is located in the northern part of Nassau County and because the terrain is very hilly in the area.

In the 1960s, 1970s, and 1980s, North Hills proposed rezoning and downzoning large portions of the village as part of a master plan. The plan was to downzone and rezone for multiple uses, including for condominiums and cluster residences, a shopping center, and commercial and office buildings.

The plan was extremely controversial as the downzoning of large estates included the estates of some village officials and their families, and it was believed that the officials were looking to downzone their properties for their own, personal benefit; it was also pointed out that the plans would have a severe, negative impact on neighboring communities, and that the village's planning board was bypassed when drafting the plan. This caused the Village Board of adjacent Roslyn Estates to send telegrams to Governor Hugh Carey and Attorney General Louis Lefkowitz in 1977, asking them to investigate the matter, citing "possible impeachable offenses" from the officials in North Hills.

The master plan was rejected by the Nassau County Planning Commission twice – first in 1970 and then again in 1980 after revisions were made. Then, after several more modifications were made, it was approved in March 1980.

On May 16, 1983, North Hills dedicated Lowell H. Kane Park. The park, which is owned and operated by North Hills, is named after Lowell H. Kane, the former Mayor of North Hills.

Deepdale Country Club controversy 
As the general housing situation of the village of North Hills is private, gated community style living, there is little communal activity. In the 2000s, after being ranked as one of the wealthiest communities in the United States, the Mayor of North Hills decided that acquiring the Deepdale Golf Club through eminent domain for the exclusive use of residents would make the village a better place, and that it would raise home values. Deepdale, which is located on the grounds of the former estate of Joseph P. Grace, served the village with legal papers, claiming that they were abusing government power by trying to close a country club for residents only. After much dispute in and out of court, the case eventually dissolved, leaving the club in the hands of its members.

Geography

The Long Island Expressway (Interstate 495) and the Northern State Parkway travel through North Hills.

Demographics 

As of the census of 2000, there were 4,301 people, 1,808 households, and 1,424 families residing in the village. The population density was 1,542.5 people per square mile (595.2/km2). There were 1,907 housing units at an average density of 683.9 per square mile (263.9/km2). The racial makeup of the village was 81.42% White, 0.91% African American, 15.83% Asian, 0.14% from other races, and 1.70% from two or more races. Hispanic or Latino of any race were 1.44% of the population.

There were 1,808 households, out of which 19.0% had children under the age of 18 living with them, 73.5% were married couples living together, 3.8% had a female householder with no husband present, and 21.2% were non-families. 18.1% of all households were made up of individuals, and 9.2% had someone living alone who was 65 years of age or older. The average household size was 2.37 and the average family size was 2.66.

In the village, the population was spread out, with 14.5% under the age of 18, 4.0% from 18 to 24, 17.2% from 25 to 44, 36.9% from 45 to 64, and 27.3% who were 65 years of age or older. The median age was 54 years. For every 100 females, there were 91.3 males. For every 100 females age 18 and over, there were 89.1 males.

The median income for a household in the village was $149,122, and the median income for a family was $184,223. Males had a median income of $100,000 versus $60,789 for females. The per capita income for the village was $100,093. About 3.4% of families and 6.3% of the population were below the poverty line, including 16.1% of those under age 18 and 6.0% of those age 65 or over.

Government

Village government 
As of June 2021, the Mayor of North Hills is Marvin Natiss, the Deputy Mayor of North Hills is Dennis Sgambati, and the Village Trustees of North Hills are Elliott Arnold, Gail Cohen, and Phyllis Lentini.

Representation in higher government

Town representation 
North Hills is located in the Town of North Hempstead's 4th council district, which as of March 2022 is represented on the North Hempstead Town Council by Veronica Lurvey (D–Great Neck). However, a small corner of the village is located in the 5th council district, which as of March 2022 is represented on the North Hempstead Town Council by David A. Adhami (R–Great Neck).

Nassau County representation 
North Hills is located in Nassau County's 10th Legislative district, which as of March 2022 is represented in the Nassau County Legislature by Mazi Melesa Pilip (R–Great Neck).

New York State representation

New York State Assembly 
North Hills is located in the New York State Assembly's 16th Assembly district, which as of March 2022 is represented by Gina Sillitti (D–Manorhaven).

New York State Senate 
North Hills is located in the New York State Senate's 7th State Senate district, which as of March 2022 is represented in the New York State Senate by Anna Kaplan (D–North Hills).

Federal representation

United States Congress 
North Hills is located in New York's 3rd congressional district, which as of March 2022 is represented in the United States Congress by Tom Suozzi (D–Glen Cove).

United States Senate 
Like the rest of New York, North Hills is represented in the United States Senate by Charles Schumer (D) and Kirsten Gillibrand (D).

Politics 
In the 2016 U.S. presidential election, the majority of North Hills voters voted for Hillary Clinton (D).

Parks and recreation

 Christopher Morley Park – A Nassau County-owned park located at the northeastern corner of North Hills.
Lowell H. Kane Park – A park owned and operated by North Hills exclusively for village residents and their guests.

Education

Schools

Public 
North Hills is split among four public school districts. Depending on where in North Hills they reside, students attending public schools go to the Great Neck Union Free School District, the Herricks Union Free School District, the Manhasset Union Free School District, or the Roslyn Union Free School District.

Additionally, the Manhasset UFSD's Shelter Rock Elementary School is located within the village.

Private 
The Buckley Country Day School is located within North Hills.

Library districts 
North Hills is split among four library districts. The Great Neck Library District serves the portions of North Hills zoned for the Great Neck UFSD, the Manhasset Library District served the areas zoned for the Manhasset UFSD, Roslyn's library district (the Bryant Library) serves the areas zoned for the Roslyn UFSD, and the Shelter Rock Library District serves the areas zoned for the Herricks UFSD.

Infrastructure

Transportation

Road 
Two limited-access highways, the Long Island Expressway (Interstate 495) and the Northern State Parkway, travel through and serve the village; the historic Long Island Motor Parkway used to pass through North Hills, as well. Other major roads which travel through North Hills include I.U. Willets Road, Searingtown Road, and Shelter Rock Road.

Road layout 
The road layout in North Hills is varied. Certain areas primarily feature cul-de-sacs, whereas other areas (especially the gated developments) feature many unpredictable, meandering roads.

The village does not own any of the streets within the village, thus meaning they are not maintained through the village. The majority of streets within North Hills are privately-owned and maintained. Other streets are maintained and owned by Nassau County or New York State.

Rail 
No rail lines pass through North Hills. The nearest Long Island Rail Road stations to the village are Manhasset on the Port Washington Branch and Roslyn on the Oyster Bay Branch.

Bus 
The n25 and n26 bus routes run through a small section of the southwestern portion of the village. These two bus routes are operated by Nassau Inter-County Express (NICE).

The Village of North Hills also operates a free commuter shuttle between Village Hall and the Manhasset LIRR station for village residents; a designated shuttle parking lot is located at Village Hall. The shuttle runs weekdays and a village-issued permit is required for transport.

Utilities

Natural gas 
National Grid USA provides natural gas to homes and businesses that are hooked up to natural gas lines in North Hills.

Power 
PSEG Long Island provides power to all homes and businesses within North Hills.

Sewage 
The majority of North Hills is sewered. The areas which are sewered are connected to and located with the Nassau County Sewage District, which handles and treats the village's sanitary waste.

The remainder of North Hills relies on cesspools and septic systems. The unsewered areas in North Hills are primarily located along the panhandle extending towards Manhasset.

Water 
North Hills is located within the boundaries of the Albertson Water District, the Garden City Park Water District, the Manhasset–Lakeville Water District, and the Roslyn Water District. Of these 4 water districts, the Manhasset–Lakeville Water District serves the majority of the village.

Notable people 

 Nicholas F. Brady – Businessman.
Anna M. Kaplan – Politician.
 Ralph Pulitzer – Publisher.

References

External links 

 Official website

North Hills, New York
Town of North Hempstead, New York
Villages in New York (state)
Villages in Nassau County, New York